Ellwood City is the tenth studio album by American rock singer Donnie Iris, released in 2006.

Track listing
"Little Black Dress" (Avsec, Goll, Hoenes, Ierace, Valentine)
"Soul Man" (David Porter, Isaac Hayes)
"Let's Go" (Avsec, Goll, Hoenes, Ierace, Valentine)
"River of Love" (Avsec)
"Just Go Tango" (Avsec, Goll, Hoenes, Ierace, Valentine)
"Rocque Fantastique" (Avsec, Goll, Hoenes, Ierace, Valentine)
"Ellwood City" (Avsec)
"Love Me with the Light On" (Avsec, Goll, Hoenes, Ierace, Foster)
"No Rest for the Wicked" (Avsec, Goll, Hoenes, Ierace, Valentine)
"Love Messiah" (Avsec, Goll, Hoenes, Ierace, Valentine)
"You Got My Body (You Don't Have My Soul)" (Avsec, Ierace, Valentine)
"Tuesday Morning" (Avsec)
"Love Me with the Light On" (Avsec, Iris, Hoenes, Goll, Foster)
"Just Go Tango" (extended mix) (Avsec)
"With This Ring" *Bonus Track
"Hard Spot" (Avsec) *Special Bonus Track

Personnel
Donnie Iris - lead and background vocals
Mark Avsec	- piano, organ, synthesizers, background vocals
Marty Lee Hoenes - guitars, background vocals
Paul Goll - bass, background vocals
Kevin Valentine - drums, percussion
Brice Foster - drums on tracks 4, 7, 8, and 13

Production
Mark Avsec - Producer
Marty Lee Hoenes - Design

References

Donnie Iris albums
2006 albums
Albums produced by Mark Avsec